The Kadassa River is a river of Sumba, East Nusa Tenggara, Indonesia.

Geography 
The river flows along the northern area of Sumba with predominantly tropical savanna climate (designated as As in the Köppen-Geiger climate classification). The annual average temperature in the area is 26 °C. The warmest month is October, when the average temperature is around 32 °C, and the coldest is January, at 24 °C. The average annual rainfall is 1441 mm. The wettest month is February, with an average of 206 mm rainfall, and the driest is September, with 8 mm rainfall.

See also
List of rivers of Indonesia
List of rivers of Lesser Sunda Islands

References

Rivers of Sumba
Rivers of Indonesia